Al-Mahaqirah is a small village in Sanhan District of Sanaa Governorate, Yemen. It lies about 15km from Sanaa, just east of the road to Ta'izz.

History 
The earliest known mention of Matnah in historical sources is in 1396 (798 AH), in the Ghayat al-amani of Yahya ibn al-Husayn. That year, its fort was destroyed by one Ali ibn Salah al-Din.

References 

Villages in Sanaa Governorate